The Sea Lady is a fantasy novel  by British writer H. G. Wells, including some of the aspects of a fable. It was serialized from July to December 1901 in Pearson's Magazine before being published as a volume by Methuen. The inspiration for the novel was Wells's glimpse of May Nisbet, the daughter of the Times drama critic, in a bathing suit, when she came to visit at Sandgate, Wells having agreed to pay her school fees after her father's death.

In presenting a creature of legend active in the prosaic contemporary genteel English society, the book clearly falls into the definition of contemporary or even urban fantasy, at the time not yet recognized as a distinct subgenre.

Plot 
The intricately narrated story involves a mermaid who comes ashore on the southern coast of England in 1899. Feigning a desire to become part of genteel society (under the alias "Miss Doris Thalassia Waters"), the mermaid's real design is to seduce Harry Chatteris, a man she saw "some years ago" in "the South Seas—near Tonga," who has taken her fancy. This she reveals in a conversation with the narrator's second cousin Melville, a friend of the family who adopts "Miss Waters". As a supernatural being, she is unimpressed with the fact that Chatteris is engaged to the socially-minded Miss Adeline Glendower and is trying to make amends for his wastrel youth by entering politics. With mere words, the mermaid shakes both Chatteris and Melville's faith in their society's norms and expectations, enigmatically telling them that "there are better dreams". In the end, Chatteris is unable to resist her alluring charms, though succumbing supposedly means his death.

Themes 

Couched in the language of fantasy and romance that blends with light-hearted social satire, The Sea Lady explores serious themes of nature, sex, the imagination, and the ideal in an Edwardian world in which moral restraints are loosening. Wells wrote in Experiment in Autobiography that The Sea Lady reflected his "craving for some lovelier experience than life had yet given me."

In its narrative structure, The Sea Lady plays cleverly with conventions of historical and journalistic research and verification. According to John Clute, "Structurally it is the most complex thing Wells ever wrote, certainly the only novel Wells ever wrote to directly confirm our understanding that he did, indeed, read Henry James." Adam Roberts has argued that The Sea Lady was written in a kind of dialogue with James's The Sacred Fount (1901).

See also 
 The Lady from the Sea
 The Little Mermaid
 Undine
 Mermaids in popular culture

References

Further reading 
 
 
 
 
 McLean, Steven, A fantastic, unwholesome little dream': The Illusion of Reality and Sexual Politics in H. G. Wells's The Sea Lady", Papers on Language and Literature, 49 (2013), 70–85.

External links 

 The Sea Lady at Open Library
 
 An essay on The Sea Lady by Adam Roberts

1902 British novels
1902 fantasy novels
British fantasy novels
British philosophical novels
British romance novels
British satirical novels
Fictional mermen and mermaids
Mermaid novels
Mermaids in popular culture
Metaphysical fiction novels
Novels by H. G. Wells
Novels first published in serial form
Urban fantasy novels
Works originally published in Pearson's Magazine